The Medina-class lifeboat was a prototype Rigid Inflatable Boat that was considered by the Royal National Lifeboat Institution of the United Kingdom and Ireland in 1980s. It was based on the design of the Atlantic 21-class lifeboats. 

The first two boats were funded by The Romsey Trust after an appeal from Lord Mountbatten in 1979. The third boat was funded by the RNLI.

Fleet

References

External links
RNLI Fleet

Royal National Lifeboat Institution lifeboats